Fucus virsoides is a species of brown alga endemic to the Adriatic Sea. The Bay of Kotor was defined as one of the southernmost limits of Fucus virsoides.

References

Biota of the Mediterranean Sea
Plants described in 1868
Fucaceae
Taxa named by Jacob Georg Agardh